Lu Feng (January 1927 – 1 June 2022) was a Chinese politician. He was a representative of the 12th, 13th, 14th, and 15th National Congress of the Chinese Communist Party. He was a member of the 14th Central Committee of the Chinese Communist Party.

He served as head of the Organization Department of the Chinese Communist Party from 1989 to 1994.

He died on 1 June 2022 at the age of 95.

References

1927 births
2022 deaths
Chinese politicians
Chinese Communist Party politicians
People from Lulong County
Members of the 14th Central Committee of the Chinese Communist Party